Otto Flake (29 October 1880, Metz – 10 November 1963) was a German writer.

Early life
Flake was born on 29 October 1880 in Metz. He attended high school in Colmar and studied German philology, philosophy and art history at the University of Strasbourg.

Career
Flake has an extensive œuvre that includes two volumes of fairy tales that rework traditional folk-tale characters and beliefs.

Personal life

Flake was married five times, including to German doctor and socialist Minna Flake, with whom he had a son, Thomas Flake, who was born in 1908, and twice to the mother of his daughter, Eva Maria (née Flake) Seveno.

He died on 10 November 1963 in Baden-Baden, where he was buried.

References

External links
 
 

1880 births
1963 deaths
Writers from Metz
People from Alsace-Lorraine
German-language writers
German male writers